Punta El Chiquirín is the easternmost point of the mainland of El Salvador (not counting the land border with Honduras).

Chiquirin
Landforms of El Salvador